Mark Clayton may refer to:

Mark Clayton (American football, born 1961), American football wide receiver for the Miami Dolphins and Green Bay Packers
Mark Clayton (American football, born 1982), American football wide receiver for the Baltimore Ravens and St. Louis Rams